The Firebrace Baronetcy, of London, was a title in the Baronetage of England. It was created on 28 July 1698 for Basil Firebrace, Member of Parliament for Chippenham from 1690 to 1692. He was the son of Sir Henry Firebrace. The third Baronet sat as Member of Parliament for Suffolk. The title became extinct on his death in 1759.

Firebrace baronets, of London

Sir Basil Firebrace, 1st Baronet (1652–1724)
Sir Charles Firebrace, 2nd Baronet (1680–1727)
Sir Cordell Firebrace, 3rd Baronet (1712–1759)

References

 

Firebrace
1698 establishments in England